Mayo Clinic Health System - Mankato, formerly known as Immanuel-St. Joseph's Hospital, is a general medical and surgical hospital in Mankato, Minnesota. It has been a part of Mayo Clinic since 1996. Immanuel-St. Joseph's was formed in 1969 from a merger between two Mankato hospitals, Immanuel Hospital (established 1906) and St. Joseph's Hospital (established 1898). The 161-bed hospital currently employs 3,302 employees, and is one of the largest employers in Mankato. Construction is expected to begin in the spring of 2023 on a 121-bed expansion that will include a new and expanded Intensive Care Unit, as well as a Progressive Care Unit to care for the most critically ill patients

Services
Inpatient services provided include: birthing rooms, adult heart catheterization and diagnostics, hospice, pain management, cancer treatment, and psychiatric emergency services.   Outpatient services include:  chemotherapy, trauma center, Chiropractic treatment, dentistry care, kidney dialysis, physical rehabilitation, substance abuse treatment, and urgent care.  Diagnostic equipment available include:  CT scanner, a diagnostic radioisotope facility, Magnetic resonance imaging, Multislice spiral CT, Single photon emission CT, and ultrasound.

References

Buildings and structures in Blue Earth County, Minnesota
Mankato, Minnesota
Hospitals in Minnesota
Hospitals established in 1898
Hospitals established in 1996
Mayo Clinic